The Indian Scarf is a 1963 West German crime film directed by Alfred Vohrer. It was part of a very successful series of German films based on the writings of Edgar Wallace and adapted from the 1931 play The Case of the Frightened Lady.

Plot
After the rich Lord Lebanon has been strangled, a group of different characters assembles at Mark's Priory, his lonely manor in the north of Scotland, to attend the reading of his will. However, as lawyer Frank Tanner explains—in reading a "second-to-last-will"—to the potential heirs, they will first have to stay together at the manor for six days and six nights. Thinking that Lebanon has died of heart failure they all agree. It turns out to be a dangerous requirement as the manor is cut off from the outside world by a storm and one by one the visitors are murdered—strangled with an Indian scarf. In the end, of all the guests, family and staff only Tanner, Isla Harris and Bonwit the butler survive. The last will is read and it is revealed that Lord Lebanon has in fact left all his money to the man he considered to be the greatest of the century: Edgar Wallace.

Cast
 Heinz Drache as Frank Tanner
 Corny Collins as Isla Harris
 Klaus Kinski as Peter Ross
 Gisela Uhlen as Mrs. Tilling, née Lebanon
 Hans Nielsen as Mr. Tilling
 Siegfried Schürenberg as Sir Henry Hockbridge
 Richard Häussler as Dr. Amersham
 Hans Clarin as Lord Edward Lebanon
 Alexander Engel as Reverend Hastings
 Ady Berber as Chiko
 Eddi Arent as Richard Maria Bonwit
 Elisabeth Flickenschildt as Lady Emily Lebanon
 Rainer Brandt as Inspector Fuchsberger (voice) (uncredited)
  as Edgar Wallace's secretary/ body in the morgue (uncredited)
 Eberhard Junkersdorf as Lord Edward Lebanon / killer with the scarf (uncredited)
 Alfred Vohrer as Edgar Wallace / Sir Henry's parrot (voice) / radio announcer(voice) (uncredited)
 Wilhelm Vorwerg as Lord Frances Percival Lebanon (uncredited)

Production
Das indische Tuch was part of a series of films based on works by Edgar Wallace made in the late 1950s and 1960s by producer Horst Wendlandt for Rialto Film. The script to the film was adapted first by Georg Hurdalek and then Harald G. Petersson from an original treatment by Egon Eis, written under the pen name of Trygve Larsen, that had not found the approval of the producer. At this stage, the film was to be called Der Unheimliche. The scripts were derived from the Edgar Wallace play The Frightened Lady. There were two previous film versions based on it, both British and called The Frightened Lady, made in 1932 and 1940. Of the three, Vohrer's version was the one that deviated most from the original play. The story becomes a case of Ten Little Indians, as the protagonists are killed off one by one. Unusually for a film of the series, even leading man Heinz Drache's character comes under suspicion.

Heinz Drache was cast for this film after having starred as the hero of a very successful TV production of Francis Durbridge's The Scarf, which involved a similar modus operandi and was first aired in 1962. Several other actors, like Kinski, Arent and Schürenberg, had by that time become regulars in the film series.

The film was shot between 8 July and 13 August 1963 entirely in the Spandau Studios in West Berlin. There were no exterior shots at all. Wilhelm Vorwerk, who appears as Lord Lebanon, was not an actor, but rather the production designer at the Spandau studios. Eva Ebner was Vohrer's assistant. A final in-joke that was cut from more recent TV versions but restored for the DVD is a telephone call purporting to be from an "Inspector Fuchsberger", a reference to actor Joachim Fuchsberger, another leading man from the series of Wallace films made by Rialto.

The FSK gave the film a rating of 16 years and up and deemed it not appropriate for screenings on public holidays. It was released on 13 September 1963.

See also
 The Frightened Lady (1932)
 The Case of the Frightened Lady (1940)

References

External links

1963 films
1960s mystery thriller films
German mystery thriller films
West German films
1960s German-language films
German black-and-white films
German films based on plays
Remakes of British films
Films directed by Alfred Vohrer
Films based on works by Edgar Wallace
Films produced by Horst Wendlandt
Films set in Scotland
Films shot at Spandau Studios
Films about inheritances
Films set in country houses
1960s German films